Felixounavirus (synonyms: FelixO1likevirus, and Felixounalikevirus) is a genus of viruses in the order Caudovirales, in the family Myoviridae. Bacteria serve as natural hosts, with transmission achieved through passive diffusion. There are currently 16 species in this genus, including the type species Salmonella virus FelixO1.

Taxonomy
The following species are recognized:
 Escherichia virus Alf5
 Escherichia virus AYO145A
 Escherichia virus EC6
 Escherichia virus HY02
 Escherichia virus JH2
 Escherichia virus TP1
 Escherichia virus VpaE1
 Escherichia virus wV8
 Salmonella virus BPS15Q2
 Salmonella virus BPS17L1
 Salmonella virus BPS17W1
 Salmonella virus FelixO1
 Salmonella virus Mushroom
 Salmonella virus Si3
 Salmonella virus SP116
 Salmonella virus UAB87

Structure
Viruses in Felixounavirus are non-enveloped, with head-tail geometries. The diameter is around 73 nm. The tail is around 17  nm wide, 113 nm long, with six long straight terminal fibers and a baseplate. The tail sheath presents a criss-cross pattern with no transverse striations. Genomes are linear, around 86kb in length. The genome codes for 131 proteins.

Genome
All three species have been fully sequenced and are available from ICTV, including two strains of Erwinia phage phiEa21-4. They range between 84k and 89k nucleotides, with 118 to 140 proteins. The complete genomes are available from here.

Life cycle
The virus attaches to the host cell using its terminal fibers, and ejects the viral DNA into the host cytoplasm via contraction of its tail sheath. Viral replication is cytoplasmic. DNA-templated transcription is the method of transcription. Once the viral genes have been replicated, the procapsid is assembled and packed. The tail is then assembled and the mature virions are released via lysis.

History
According to the ICTV's 2010–11 report, the genus FelixO1likevirus was first accepted as a new genus, at the same time as all three of its contained species . The following year (2012), the name was changed to Felixounalikevirus. This proposal is available here. The genus was later renamed to Felixounavirus.

References

External links
 Viralzone: Felixounalikevirus
 ICTV

Myoviridae
Virus genera